"Fast Girls" is a song by Janet Jackson and is the second and final single released from Dream Street. It peaked at #40 on the R&B charts. The song was written and produced by fellow A&M artist Jesse Johnson.

The single had two different B-sides. The first B-side was "Love and My Best Friend", taken from her debut album Janet Jackson, while the second B-Side was the French Blue medley of "Fast Girls" and "Pretty Boy", which, like "Fast Girls", was also written and produced by Jesse Johnson.

The album version of "Fast Girls" was later released as the B-side of both her US singles "Control" and "The Pleasure Principle". Jesse Johnson's own version of "Fast Girls" was released shortly after as the B-side to his "I Want My Girl" single in 1985.

To date, Jackson has never performed the song live.

Official versions
 Album version – 3:21 
 Seven-inch version° – 3:36
 Special remixed version° – 6:59

Exclusive twelve-inch B-side > "French Blue" – 6:22
"French Blue" is not a new song, as it is a mashup remix produced by Jesse Johnson of two songs originally produced by him: "Fast Girls" and "Pretty Boy".

°Unavailable on CD

Charts

References

1984 singles
Janet Jackson songs
1984 songs
A&M Records singles
Songs written by Jesse Johnson (musician)